Michael Nolan (died 1827) was an Irish barrister and judge, known as a politician and legal author.

Life
Born in Ireland, Nolan was admitted an attorney of the Irish Court of Exchequer about 1787, and was called to the English bar at Lincoln's Inn in 1792. He practised as a special pleader on the home circuit and at the Surrey sessions, gained experience of the details of the Poor Laws.

In 1823 he asked for appointment as Puisne Justice of Chester, losing out to Thomas Jervis. He left parliament in March 1824, on being appointed justice of the counties of Brecon, Glamorgan, and Radnor, and died in 1827.

Works
In 1793 Nolan published Reports of Cases relative to the Duty and Office of a Justice of Peace from 1791 to 1793, London. He edited the Reports of Sir John Strange, London, 1795, 2 vols., and was one of the editors of the ‘Supplement’ to Charles Viner's Abridgment, London, 1799–1806, 6 vols.

Nolan's A Treatise of the Laws for the Relief and Settlement of the Poor, (London, 1805, 2 vols.; 4th edit. in 1825, 3 vols.) made his reputation in the legal world. He published also:

 A Syllabus of Lectures intended to be delivered in Pursuance of an Order of the Hon. Soc. of Lincoln's Inn in their Hall, London, 1796; and 
 Speech … delivered in the House of Commons, Wednesday, July 10, 1822, on moving for leave to bring in a Bill to alter and amend the Laws for the Relief of the Poor, London, 1822.

Notes

Attribution

Year of birth missing
1827 deaths
Irish barristers
Irish legal writers
Members of the Parliament of the United Kingdom for Barnstaple
Expatriate judges from Ireland
Tory MPs (pre-1834)
UK MPs 1820–1826